PF-00446687 is a drug developed by Pfizer for the treatment of erectile dysfunction, which is a non-peptide agonist selective for the melanocortin receptor subtype MC4. It was found to be active in preliminary human trials, with the 200mg dose being of similar effectiveness to 100mg sildenafil, though lower doses were ineffective. 

While it is unclear whether PF-00446687 itself will be potent and effective enough to be developed for medical use, it has demonstrated that selectively targeting the MC4 subtype can produce similar aphrodisiac effects to older non-selective peptide-based melanocortin receptor agonists like melanotan II and bremelanotide, without the side effects caused by action at the other melanocortin receptor subtypes.

See also
 PL-6983
 PF-219,061
 UK-414,495

References

External links
Viagra, Cialis & Kamagra

Erectile dysfunction drugs
Female sexual dysfunction drugs
Melanocortin receptor agonists
4-Phenylpiperidines
Pfizer brands
Tert-butyl compounds
Fluoroarenes
Experimental drugs
Aphrodisiacs